Segal McCambridge Singer & Mahoney, Ltd., is a U.S.-based law firm with approximately 140 lawyers in eight offices. Headquartered in Chicago, Illinois, Segal McCambridge is a litigation firm  with broad experience in appellate, commercial, complex toxic tort, construction, employment and labor law, environmental, insurance, pharmaceutical and medical device, professional liability, products liability, transportation and warranty matters.

Overview
In 1986, Chicago attorneys William F. Mahoney, Edward J. McCambridge, Donald Segal, and Jeffrey Singer, founded Segal McCambridge Singer & Mahoney, Ltd. By the mid-nineties, the firm had grown to 20 attorneys. Today, Segal McCambridge has ten offices across the United States: Austin (1999), Chicago (1986), Detroit (1997), Ft. Lauderdale (2020), Houston (2018), Indianapolis (2021), Jersey City (2008), New York City (2003), Philadelphia (2000), and St. Louis (2015).

Segal McCambridge is headquartered in the Willis Tower (formerly the Sears Tower) in Chicago, Illinois.

References

External links
Official website

Law firms based in Illinois
1986 establishments in Illinois